Wilderness is a novel by American writer Robert B. Parker.

Plot summary

At 46, Aaron Newman was enjoying the good things in life - a good marriage, a good job - and he was in good shape himself. Then he saw the murder. A petty vicious killing that was to plunge him into an insane jungle of raw violence and fear, threatening and defiling the things he cared about.

Wilderness is not a Spenser novel.

Reviews 
"A novel of violence, crisp dialogue, and suspense . . . the reader is immediately caught up in the ambience of danger."—The Boston Globe

References 

1979 American novels
Novels by Robert B. Parker
American crime novels
Delacorte Press books